An earthquake occurred with a magnitude 6.9  on 24 March, 2011. It had an epicenter in the eastern part of Shan State in Myanmar with a hypocenter 10 km deep. It had two aftershocks, one of magnitude 4.8, another at magnitude 5.4, and two subsequent shocks at magnitude 5.0 and 6.2.

Geology

The earthquake occurred in an area of complex tectonics caused by the continuing collision between the northward moving Indo-Australian Plate and the Eurasian Plate, which created the Arakan Yoma mountains. In this zone of highly oblique collision, most of the motion is accommodated by the north-south trending Sagaing fault, a major dextral (right lateral) strike-slip fault that runs through the western and central part of Burma. The remaining component of shortening across this zone causes distributed deformation of eastern Burma and Thailand extending into Laos. This deformation is partly accommodated by a set of southwest-northeast trending sinistral (left lateral) strike-slip faults. The faults closest to the epicenter are the Mae Chan and Nam Ma faults. The focal mechanism for this earthquake is consistent with left-lateral movement on one of these faults, away from the main zones of seismic activity in Burma. Other recent significant earthquakes in this area included the 2011 Yunnan earthquake and the 2007 Laos earthquake. According to the Earth Observatory of Singapore, it appears likely that it was caused by motion on the western segment of the Nan Ma Fault.

Casualties

Early reports suggested that at least 10 people were killed by quake-triggered landslides in the town of Tachileik, including a child, as well as Tarpin to its north, both in Shan State, northeastern Burma. Another person was killed in Mae Sai, Thailand, near the Burmese border, a woman crushed by a wall in her bed. At least three injuries were reported in Burma.

After sunrise, the casualty toll increased to 24 in Burma, in addition to the one fatality in Thailand. Officials warned that the death toll is likely to rise. Later, death toll rose to 74 killed in Burma and 1 in Thailand, while 111 people were injured. In Tarlay, located between Tachileik and Mong Hpyak, at least 40 were killed when 130 houses collapsed. Vertical displacement of 1.5 metres in subsidence was observed in the area.

The Bangkok Post reported on 27 March 2011 that the death toll was "over 150", which is double the official figure of 75.

Aftermath
Temporary evacuations of tall buildings took place in Chiang Rai of Thailand, Menghai County in Yunnan, Nanning in Guangxi Zhuang Autonomous Region of China, and in Hanoi of Vietnam. At least one bridge is reported collapsed in Myanmar. In total, 390 residential homes, 14 monasteries and 9 government buildings were destroyed. In Monglin,  at least 128 homes were reduced to rubble. According to the United States Geological Survey's population exposure data, the final damage are most likely to be slightly under US$100 million.

See also 
List of earthquakes in 2011
List of earthquakes in Myanmar
List of earthquakes in Thailand
1912 Maymyo earthquake

References

External links

 Earth Observatory of Singapore: Myanmar earthquake of 24 March – Magnitude 6.8 (Regional Tectonics Explained)
 Earthquake Report
 

2011 earthquakes
2011 in Myanmar
2011 in Thailand
2011 in Laos
2011 disasters in China
Earthquakes in Thailand
Earthquakes in Myanmar
Earthquakes in Laos
History of Shan State
2011 in Vietnam
Earthquakes in Vietnam
March 2011 events in Asia
Strike-slip earthquakes
2011 disasters in Myanmar